Border: Carnival (stylized in all caps) is the second extended play (EP) by South Korean boy band Enhypen. It was released on April 26, 2021, through Belift Lab. The album consists of six tracks, including the lead single "Drunk-Dazed".

Background and release
On March 25, 2021, Belift Lab announced that Enhypen would make their comeback at the end of April.  A trailer titled "Intro : The Invitation" was released on April 5, announcing that their second extended play Border: Carnival. On April 8, it was announced that the album pre-orders had surpassed 370,000 copies in three days. Prior to its release day, album pre-orders had surpassed 450,000 copies. The EP was released in conjunction with its lead single "Drunk-Dazed" on April 26. On May 4, the group received their first ever music show win on SBS MTV's The Show with "Drunk-Dazed". This was soon followed by wins on Show Champion and Music Bank. Border: Carnival debuted at number one on the Oricon Albums Chart, becoming the band's first chart-topper in Japan, with over 83,000 copies sold. On May 25, Border: Carnival debuted at number 18 on the Billboard 200 chart.

Track listing

Accolades

Charts

Weekly charts

Monthly charts

Year-end charts

Certifications and sales

Release history

References

2021 EPs
Enhypen EPs
Genie Music EPs
Korean-language EPs
Hybe Corporation EPs